The following is a list of mayors of the city of Chernivtsi, Ukraine. It includes positions equivalent to mayor, such as chairperson of the city council executive committee.

Austrian period

Prehistory 
In the period from 1780 to 1832 the town was ruled by so-called municipal judges. Usually they led the city only between one and two years. A longer tenure had only Joseph Hampel (1796–1800 and 1802–1811), Alexander Beldowicz (1811–1817) and the last city judge, Andreas Klug (1817–1832).

1832: Regulation of local government, creating a magistrate  

 Franz Lihotzky (1832–1848) 
 Adalbert Suchanek (1848–1854) 
 Josef Ortynski (1854–1859) 
 Josef Lepszy (1859–1861) 
 Julius Hubrich (1861–1864)

1864: Czernowitz becomes a town with its own statute 
 Jakob Ritter von Petrowicz (1864–1866)
 Anton Freiherr Kochanowski von Stawczan (1866–1874)
 Otto Ambros Edler von Rechtenberg (1874–1880)
 Wilhelm Ritter von Klimesch (1881–1887)
 Anton Freiherr Kochanowski von Stawczan (1887–1905), since April 4, 1905 honorary mayor
 Dr. Eduard Reiss (1905–1907)
 Felix Freiherr Brewer von Fürth (1907–1913)
 Dr. Salo Edler von Weisselberger (1913–1918)

Since 1918

Period of the Western Ukrainian People's Republic 
 Bezpalko Joseph Ivanovich, 1918

Romanian period
 Gheorghe Șandru, 1918-1919
 Teofil Siminovici, 1919-1920
 Gheorghe Șandru, 1920-1922
 Nicu Flondor, 1922-1926
 Barbu Grigorovici, 1926
 Radu Sbiera, 1926-1927
 Romulus Cândea, 1927-1929
 Dimitrie Marmeluc, 1933-1938
 Nicu Flondor, 1938-1940

Soviet period
 Nikitin Alexey Ivanovich, 1940-1941
 Koshov Anton Ivanovich, 1944-1945
 Gritsay Alexander Nikiforovich, 1945-1948
 , 1948-1949
 Kotko Polikarp Arkhipovich, 1949-1950
 Gutafel Victor Ivanovich, 1950-1954
 Mikhailovsky Mikhail Ivanovich, 1954-1959
 Donchenko Petro Ivanovich, 1959-1964
 Interpreter Vasil Petrovich, 1964-1972
 , 1972-1985
 , 1985-1991
 Grodetsky George Dmitrovich, 1991

Modernity
 , 1991-1004
 , 1994-2011
 , 2014-2020
 , 2020-

Gallery 
Mayors during Austrian period

See also
 Chernivtsi history
 History of Chernivtsi (in Ukrainian)

Notes 

This article incorporates information from the Ukrainian Wikipedia.

Politicians of Bukovina

History of Bukovina
Chernivtsi